Trị An is a commune (xã) and village in Vĩnh Cửu District, Đồng Nai Province, in Southeast Vietnam.

References

Populated places in Đồng Nai province
Communes of Đồng Nai province